Jesse Manyo Plange (born January 18, 1988) is a Ghanaian boxer who won silver at the 2007 All-Africa Games and qualified for the 2008 Summer Olympics.

At the 2006 Commonwealth Games, he lost in the second round to a Welshman. At the 2007 All-Africa Games, he lost the final to Suleiman Bilali. At the World Championships he was defeated by Chinese Yang Bo. In the Olympic qualification he defeated Thomas Essomba, then lost to Namibian Japhet Uutoni, and finally won against Algerian Hamoud Boubraouet to gain the third and final qualifying spot. In Beijing at the Olympics he upset Harry Tanamor in his first match but lost to Paulo Carvalho.

Professional boxing record

References

External links
 
 Bio
 Qualifier

1988 births
Living people
Light-flyweight boxers
Boxers at the 2006 Commonwealth Games
Commonwealth Games competitors for Ghana
Boxers at the 2008 Summer Olympics
Olympic boxers of Ghana
Ghanaian male boxers
African Games silver medalists for Ghana
African Games medalists in boxing
Competitors at the 2007 All-Africa Games
Boxers from Accra